Synaptotagmin-13 is a protein that in humans is encoded by the SYT13 gene.

Function 

SYT13 belongs to the large synaptotagmin protein family. All synaptotagmins show type I membrane topology, with an extracellular N terminus, a single transmembrane region, and a cytoplasmic C terminus containing tandem C2 domains. Major functions of synaptotagmins include vesicular traffic, exocytosis, and secretion.[supplied by OMIM]

References

Further reading

External links